Maurice Douglas Pugh OBE (1903–1986) was an English cricketer who played two first-class matches in India whilst serving as an officer in the Indian Police Force.

Career 
Maurice Pugh was born in Bradford, Yorkshire on 9 November 1903 and was educated at Bedford Modern School.

He was a middle-order batsman and made his first-class debut for Northern Punjab against Marylebone Cricket Club (MCC) during their inaugural tour to the sub-Continent in 1926/27. He was dismissed by the Hampshire slow left-arm bowler Stuart Boyes for 16. The following season he appeared for the Punjab Governor's XI against Northern India and was dismissed for 1 in his only innings.

He made two appearances for Bedfordshire in the Minor Counties Championship whilst on leave in England during 1929.

Back in India he played further non first-class matches for the Punjab Governor's XI against Punjab University and Punjab and North-West Frontier Province against the Free Foresters in the 1930/31 season.

Maurice Pugh also played Rugby Union for Bedford.

As a police officer Pugh rose to become Deputy Inspector General for the North-West Frontier Province. He was awarded the OBE in 1948.

Maurice Pugh died on 30 August 1986 at Bedford, England.

External links

References 

1903 births
1986 deaths
People educated at Bedford Modern School
Northern Punjab cricketers
English cricketers
Bedford Blues players
Officers of the Order of the British Empire
Indian Police Service officers in British India
Bedfordshire cricketers